The women's 3 metre springboard diving competition at the 2002 Asian Games in Busan was held on 10 October at the Sajik Swimming Pool.

Schedule
All times are Korea Standard Time (UTC+09:00)

Results

Preliminary

Semifinal

Final

References 

2002 Asian Games Report, Pages 241–242
Results

Diving at the 2002 Asian Games